The Humboldt State Lumberjacks college football team represent Humboldt State University. The Lumberjacks competed as an independent until joining the Far Western Conference (FWC) in 1946. The conference was renamed to the Northern California Athletic Conference (NCAC) in 1983, and they remained in the NCAC until the conference folded after the 1996 season. They then competed in the NAIA's Columbia Football Association (CFA) from 1997 to 2000. They joined the NCAA Division II's Great Northwest Athletic Conference (GNAC) in 2001 and have played there ever since.

The program has had 15 head coaches in its 88 seasons of existence.

Coaches

Notes

References

Humboldt State Lumberjacks

Humboldt State Lumberjacks football